David Sneddon (born 1978) is a British pop artist.

David Sneddon may also refer to:

 
 David Louis Sneddon (born 1980, disappeared 2004), American university student allegedly abducted by North Korea
 Davie Sneddon (born 1936), Scottish football player
 Davie Sneddon, fictional character on Scottish soap opera Take the High Road